Boris Artemyevich Chorikov (1802–1866) was a Russian graphic artist.

Background
He is best known for his illustrations in a unique edition called Picturesque Karamzin, or Russian history in pictures (Russian:Живописный Карамзин или Русская история в картинах), which was published in St.Petersburg in 1836.

References

External links
 Федеральное государственное бюджетное учреждение культуры «Государственный Эрмитаж».
 Сайт Артхив.
 Сайт Художественная печать.

19th-century painters from the Russian Empire
Russian male painters
1802 births
1866 deaths
19th-century male artists from the Russian Empire